Tun Maung Kywe (born 15 October 1931) is a Burmese weightlifter. He competed at the 1956 Summer Olympics and the 1960 Summer Olympics.

References

External links
 

1931 births
Possibly living people
Burmese male weightlifters
Olympic weightlifters of Myanmar
Weightlifters at the 1956 Summer Olympics
Weightlifters at the 1960 Summer Olympics
People from Tanintharyi Region
Weightlifters at the 1958 Asian Games
Asian Games competitors for Myanmar